Willie McSporran MBE former chair of the Hebridean Isle of Gigha's Heritage Trust.  In 2002 the trust raised £4 million for the purchase of the island, which is now managed by its 160-strong population. 

His brother is Seamus McSporran.

External links
BBC coverage
Communitytrust.org
CFDG.org
PSC.gov

Living people
Members of the Order of the British Empire
Scottish businesspeople
Year of birth missing (living people)
Isle of Gigha